Pleuranthodium racemigerum is a monocotyledonous plant species first described by Ferdinand von Mueller, and given its current name by Rosemary Margaret Smith. Pleuranthodium racemigerum is part of the genus Pleuranthodium and the family Zingiberaceae. No subspecies are listed in the Catalog of Life.

References 

racemigerum
Taxa named by Rosemary Margaret Smith